Solar Dynamics Barbados Ltd is one of the leading Barbados-based manufacturers of solar hot water systems in the Caribbean region.  The company which has been in existence for over 33 years was established in 1972 by its current Managing Director James Husbands.

The company claims to have installed over 30,000 solar hot water systems on homes and businesses mainly across the Caribbean region.

Just after Barbados' national independence from Britain, the prime minister Errol Barrow and government of Barbados gave staunch support to the solar energy sector of Barbados.  This move by the government made Solar Dynamics one of the country's priorities in terms of moving the island forward.

External links

Official website - Online
Barbados Employs the Sun to Heat Water
Barbados, China looking at joint solar venture

Solar energy companies
Energy in Barbados
Companies of Barbados